O striglos pou egine arnaki is a 1968 Greek comedy film directed by Alekos Sakellarios.

Cast 
 Lambros Konstantaras - Leonidas Petroheilos
 Maro Kontou - Mary Hatzithoma
 Pavlos Liaros - Kimon Petroheilos
 Thanos Papadopoulos - Andreas Petroheilos
 Vangelis Ioannidis - Babis Petroheilos
 Mitsi Konstadara - Despoina Anifantouli
 Stavros Xenidis - Xenofon
 Vasilis Georgiadis
 Giorgos Kyriakidis
 Kostas Papachristos - officer

References

External links 

1968 comedy films
1968 films
Greek comedy films